Podhradí is a municipality and village in Cheb District in the Karlovy Vary Region of the Czech Republic. It has about 200 inhabitants.

Etymology
The name Podhradí (from pod hradem, i. e. "under the castle") means "area under the castle".

Geography

It lies in the Fichtel Mountains. The Ašský Stream flows through the municipality.

History
The first written mention of Neuberg Castle is from 1288, however, it was built in the first half of the 13th century. Until 1288, it was owned by the Lords of Neuberg, then Emperor Rudolf I of Bohemia handed it to Lords of Plauen as a fief. Podhradí soon returned to the possession of the Lords of Neuberg. In 1395, the castle and the village was acquired by the Zedtwitz family, who owned it until 1945.

In the 16th century, the Romanesque castle was abandoned, and after a big fire at the turn of the 16th and 17th centuries, it was severely damaged. The remains of the castle were used for building materials. The castle was replaced by a Renaissance castle, which was damaged during the Thirty Years' War and rebuilt in the late 17th century. In 1902, it was destroyed in a big fire.

After the manor was divided among several branches of the Zedtwitz family, the members of one of them had built new residence called Upper Chateau, and another residence known as Lower Chateau was built in the mid-18th century. The Upper Chateau was demolished in the 1960s, the Lower Chateau was completely demolished in 1965.

After the World War II, the German population was expelled and the village significantly depopulated.

Demographics

Sights

The Church of the Good Shepherd is the oldest Lutheran church in the area. It was built in the late Gothic style by the Zedtwitz family in 1470–1490. In the 1680s, it was rebuilt in the Baroque style. The tower was modified in 1677–1699.

Ruins of Neuberg Castle and Upper Chateau are preserved and freely accessible.

References

External links

Villages in Cheb District